Alan John McLaughlin (1 April 1920 – 19 November 1991) was an Australian rules footballer who played for the Fitzroy Football Club in the Victorian Football League (VFL).

Notes

External links 
		

1920 births
1991 deaths
Australian rules footballers from Melbourne
Fitzroy Football Club players
People from Prahran, Victoria